The White Rose Lawn Tennis Tournament was a late Victorian era grass court tennis tournament first staged in 1881 at the Yorkshire Gentlemen's Cricket Club ground, York, Yorkshire, England. In 1887 the tournament was moved to Harrogate until 1888 when it was discontinued.

History
The White Rose Lawn Tennis Tournament was a grass court tennis tournament founded in September 1881 and staged at the Yorkshire Gentlemen's Cricket Club ground, York, Yorkshire, England. In August 1887 the event was moved to Harrogate, North Yorkshire for the remainder of its run until 1888 when it was featured as part of the annual Harrogate Flower Show.

Venues
The Yorkshire Gentlemen's Cricket Club was founded in 1863, and their grounds were based at Wigginton Road, York. In 1932 they moved to Escrick, six miles south of York, which has remained the home of the club ever since. In 1887 this tournament was moved to St George's Road Cricket Ground, Harrogate.

Finals

Mens Singles
(Incomplete roll)

Mix doubles
(Incomplete roll)

References

Grass court tennis tournaments
Defunct tennis tournaments in the United Kingdom